The Frog King is a translation of the German title of a fairy tale written by the Brothers Grimm. In English the story is known as The Frog Prince 

Frog King may also refer to:
 The Frog King (novel) a 2002 novel by Adam Davies
 Kwok Mang Ho (born 1947), also known as Frog King, Hong Kong multi-media, artist

See also
 The Frog Kingdom, a 2013 Chinese animated film
 The Frog Prince (disambiguation)